Southwood is a community comprising three neighbourhoods within the southwest portion of Mill Woods in the City of Edmonton, Alberta, Canada. Neighbourhoods within the community include Crawford Plains, Daly Grove and Pollard Meadows.

The community is represented by the Southwood Community League, established in 1980, which runs a community hall located at 37 Street and 18 Avenue.

See also 
 Edmonton Federation of Community Leagues

References

External links 
Southwood Community League

Neighbourhoods in Edmonton